Spain competed at the 1980 Summer Olympics in Moscow, USSR. In partial support of the American-led Olympics boycott, Spain competed under the Olympic Flag instead of its national flag. 155 competitors, 146 men and 9 women, took part in 75 events in 18 sports.

Medalists

Archery

After not competing in archery in 1976, Spain returned to the sport in 1980. Two Spanish men competed.

Men's Individual Competition:
 Antonio Vazquez — 2240 points (→ 29th place)
 Francisco Peralta — 2181 points (→ 33rd place)

Athletics

Men's 800 metres
Colomán Trabado
 Heat — 1:47.9 
 Semifinals — 1:48.1 (→ did not advance)

Antonio Páez
 Heat — 1:49.5
 Semifinals — 1:47.8 (→ did not advance)

Men's 1,500 metres
José Luis González
 Heat — 3:40.9
 Semifinals — 3:42.6 (→ did not advance)

José Manuel Abascal
 Heat — 3:44.7 (→ did not advance)

Men's 10,000 metres
Antonio Prieto 
 Heat — 29:12.8 (→ did not advance)

Men's 4 × 400 metres Relay
 Isidoro Hornillos, Colomán Trabado, Benjamín González, and José Casabona
 Heat — 3:06.9 (→ did not advance)

Men's 110 m Hurdles
 Javier Moracho
 Heat — 13.72
 Semifinals — 13.80
 Final — 13.78 (→ 7th place)

 Carlos Sala
 Heat — 14.28
 Semifinals — 14.00 (→ did not advance)

Men's 400 m Hurdles
 Juan Lloveras
 Heat — 50.48
 Semifinals — 51.86 (→ did not advance)

 José Casabona
 Heat — 51.26 (→ did not advance)

Men's 3,000 m Steeplechase
 Domingo Ramón
 Heat — 8:31.9 
 Semifinals — 8:22.0 
 Final — 8:15.8 (→ 4th place)

 Francisco Sánchez
 Heat — 8:27.5 
 Semifinals — 8:19.0 
 Final — 8:18.0 (→ 5th place)

Men's High Jump
Roberto Cabrejas
 Qualification — 2.21 m
 Final — 2.10 m (→ 16th place)

Martí Perarnau
 Qualification — 2.15 m (→ did not advance)

Men's Long Jump
 Antonio Corgos
 Qualification — 7.96 m
 Final — 8.09 m (→ 7th place)

 Alberto Solanas
 Qualification — 7.73 m (→ did not advance)

Men's Triple Jump
Ramon Cid
 Qualification — 16.20 m (→ did not advance)

Men's Marathon
 Eleuterio Anton
 Final — 2:18:16 (→ 22nd place)

Men's 20 km Walk
Josep Marín
 Final — 1:26:45.6 (→ 5th place)

Men's 50 km Walk
Jordi Llopart
 Final — 3:51:25 (→  Silver Medal)

Josep Marín
 Final — 4:03:08 (→ 6th place)

Basketball

Canoeing

Diving

Men's Springboard
Ricardo Camacho
 Preliminary Round — 532.02 points (→ 8th place)
 Final — 749.340 points (→ 8th place)

Fencing

Four fencers, all men, represented Spain in 1980.

Men's foil
 Miguel Roca
 Jesús Esperanza

Men's épée
 José Pérez

Men's sabre
 Valentín Paraíso

Football

Men's Team Competition
Preliminary Round (Group C)
 Spain – East Germany 1-1 (0-0) 
 Spain – Syria 0-0 (0-0) 
 Spain – Algeria 1-1 (1-0) → did not advance

Team Roster
 Joaquín Alonso
 Marcos Alonso 
 Francisco Buyo
 Miguel de Andrés
 Juan Antonio Felipe
 Agustín Gajate
 Angel González
 Francisco Guerri
 Jorge David López
 Víctor Muñoz
 Urbano Ortega
 Enrique Ramos
 Hipólito Rincón
 Agustín Rodríguez
 Santiago Urquiaga
 Manuel Zúñiga

Gymnastics

Handball

Men's Team Competition
Preliminary Round (Group A)
 Lost to East Germany (17-21)
 Defeated Denmark (20-19)
 Lost to Hungary (17-20)
 Drew with Cuba (24-24)
 Defeated Poland (24-22)
Classification Match
 5th/6th place: Defeated Yugoslavia (24-23) → 5th place

Team Roster
 Agustín Millán
 Eugenio Serrano
 Francisco López
 Gregorio López
 Javier Cabanas
 Jesús María Albisu
 José Ignacio Novoa
 José María Pagoaga
 Juan Alfonso de la Puente
 Juan Francisco Muñoz
 Juan José Uría
 Juan Pedro de Miguel
 Rafael López
 Vicente Calabuig

Hockey

Men's Team Competition
Preliminary Round
 Spain – Soviet Union 2-1
 Spain – Tanzania 12-0
 Spain – India 2-2
 Spain – Poland 6-0
 Spain – Cuba 11-0

Final
 Spain – India 3-4 →  Silver Medal

Team Roster:
 Juan Amat
 Juan Arbós
 Jaime Arbós
 Javier Cabot
 Ricardo Cabot
 Miguel Chaves
 Juan Coghen
 Miguel de Paz
 Francisco Fábregas 
 José Garcia
 Rafael Garralda
 Santiago Malgosa
 Paulino Monsalve
 Juan Pellón
 Carlos Roca
 Jaime Zumalacárregui

Judo

Modern pentathlon

Three male pentathletes represented Spain in 1980.

Men's Individual Competition:
Federico Galera — 5.001 pts, 25th place 
José Serrano — 4.887 pts, 29th place 
Manuel Montesinos — 4.811 pts, 32nd place

Men's Team Competition:
Galera, Serrano, and Montesinos — 14.699pts, 9th place

Rowing

Sailing

Open

Shooting

Open

Swimming

Men's 100m Freestyle
David López-Zubero
 Heats — 52,43
 Semi-Finals — 52,81 (→ did not advance)

Men's 200m Freestyle
Ramón Lavín
 Heats — 1.56,99 (→ did not advance)
David López-Zubero
 Heats — 1.53,22 (→ did not advance)

Men's 1.500m Freestyle
Rafael Escalas
 Final — 15.21,88 (→ 6th place)

Men's 100m Butterfly
David López-Zubero
 Final — 55,16 (→  Bronze Medal)

Women's 4 × 100 m Freestyle
Natalia Más, Margarita Armengol, Laura Flaque, and Gloria Casado
 Final — 3.58,73 (→ 8th place)

Water polo

Wrestling

Notes

Flags  indicate the autonomous community (or country) of birth of each athlete.

References

External links
 Spanish Olympic Committee

Nations at the 1980 Summer Olympics
1980
Olympics